Come on Down! The Game Show Story is a British documentary that aired from 10 to 31 August 2014 on ITV and is presented by Bradley Walsh.

External links

2010s British documentary television series
2014 British television series debuts
2014 British television series endings
ITV documentaries
Television series by ITV Studios
English-language television shows